The 2014 Hall of Fame Tennis Championships was a men's tennis tournament played on outdoor grass courts. It was the 39th edition of the Hall of Fame Tennis Championships, and was part of the ATP World Tour 250 series of the 2014 ATP World Tour. It took place at the International Tennis Hall of Fame in Newport, Rhode Island, United States, from July 7 through July 13, 2014. Third-seeded Lleyton Hewitt won the singles title.

Singles main draw entrants

Seeds 

 1 Rankings are as of June 23, 2014

Other entrants 
The following players received wildcards into the singles main draw:
  Robby Ginepri
  Mitchell Krueger
  Clay Thompson

The following players received entry from the qualifying draw:
  Austin Krajicek
  Wayne Odesnik
  Ante Pavić
  Luke Saville

Withdrawals 
Before the tournament
  Marcos Baghdatis
  Ivan Dodig
  Víctor Estrella Burgos
  Bradley Klahn
  Sam Querrey

Retirements 
  Tatsuma Ito

Doubles main draw entrants

Seeds 

 Rankings are as of June 23, 2014

Finals

Singles 

  Lleyton Hewitt defeated  Ivo Karlović, 6–3, 6–7(4–7), 7–6(7–3)

Doubles 

  Chris Guccione /  Lleyton Hewitt defeated  Jonathan Erlich /  Rajeev Ram, 7–5, 6–4

References

External links